Brian John Evans  (born August 18, 1950) is a Canadian lawyer and former provincial level politician from Alberta, Canada. He served as a member of the Legislative Assembly of Alberta from 1989 to 1997. During his time in office, he served as a cabinet minister in the Ralph Klein government.

Education and law career
Born in Edmonton, Alberta, the son of Cecil Road and Margaret Anne (Peters), Evans received a Bachelor of Arts degree in 1971 and a Bachelor of Law degree in 1975 from the University of Alberta. He articled with the Edmonton law firm of Emery Jamieson until opening Canmore, Alberta's first full-time law office in 1976, the year he was called to the Alberta Bar. He was created a Queen's Counsel in 1990.

Political career
Evans was first elected to the Alberta Legislature in the 1989 Alberta general election. He defeated two other candidates to win his first term in office, and hold the Banff-Cochrane electoral district for the Progressive Conservatives. He was re-elected with an increased popular vote and comfortable majority to win his second term in the 1993 Alberta general election defeating four challenging candidates. Evans faced a strong challenge from Liberal candidate Paul Andrews who quadrupled the Liberal vote from the previous election. After winning his second term he was appointed by Premier Ralph Klein to be the Minister of Justice and Attorney General. He retired at dissolution of the Legislature in 1997.

Return to private life
In 1997, Evans became a senior partner with the law firm of Miller Thomson LLP. In 2006, he joined the Werklund Group.

References

External links

Legislative Assembly of Alberta Members Listing

Living people
Lawyers in Alberta
1950 births
Members of the Executive Council of Alberta
Politicians from Edmonton
Progressive Conservative Association of Alberta MLAs
University of Alberta alumni
Canadian King's Counsel